Eich is a quarter in northern Luxembourg City, in southern Luxembourg.

, the quarter has a population of 2,905 inhabitants.

Commune

Eich was a commune in the canton of Luxembourg until 1 July 1920, when it was merged into the commune of Luxembourg.  Until 8 May 1849, the commune of Eich also included Rollingergrund, which was made a separate commune on that date, before being merged into the city of Luxembourg on 26 March 1920.

References

Quarters of Luxembourg City
Former communes of Luxembourg